Preston County Schools is the operating school district within Preston County, West Virginia. It is governed by the Preston County Board of Education. The school system serves 4,329 students and maintains 10 schools.

Schools
Preston High School
Aurora School
Bruceton School
Central Preston Middle School 
Fellowsville Elementary School
Kingwood Elementary School
Rowlesburg School
South Preston School
Terra Alta East Preston School
West Preston School

Former Schools
Central Preston High School
Bruceton High
Central Preston High
East Preston High
West Preston High

South Preston Middle School
West Preston Middle School

Aurora Elementary School
Tunnelton-Denver Elementary School
Valley Elementary School

References

School districts in West Virginia
Education in Preston County, West Virginia